Embarrassing Moments is a 1930 American pre-Code comedy film directed by William James Craft and written by Albert DeMond, Gladys Lehman and Earle Snell. The film stars Reginald Denny, Merna Kennedy, Otis Harlan, Greta Granstedt, Virginia Sale and William Austin. The film was released in June 1930 by Universal Pictures.

Cast 
Reginald Denny as Thaddeus Cruikshank
Merna Kennedy as Marion Fuller
Otis Harlan as Adam Fuller
Greta Granstedt as Betty Black
Virginia Sale as Aunt Prudence
William Austin as Jasper Hickson
Mary Foy as Mrs. Hickson

References

External links 
 

1930 films
1930s English-language films
American comedy films
1930 comedy films
Universal Pictures films
Films directed by William James Craft
American black-and-white films
1930s American films